Saria may refer to:

 SARIA, a food company
 Saria, Burkina Faso
 Saria (mountain), an international mountain in the Anti-Lebanon mountain range
 Saria, a heroine protagonist of Twinkle Tale
 Saria (The Legend of Zelda), a fictional character
 Saria Island, an island of Greece
 Suriya, Giridih, Jharkhand, India
 Suriya (community development block), Jharkhand, India

See also

 Sara (disambiguation)
 Sariah
 Sharia